The 1928 Preakness Stakes was the 53rd running of the Preakness. The race took place on Friday, May 11, 1928, eight days before the Kentucky Derby making it the first leg of the U.S. Triple Crown series. A horse race for three-year-old thoroughbreds, it carried a total purse of $71,370. It was run on a track rated fast in a final time of 2:00 1/5. Ridden by future U.S. Racing Hall of Fame inductee Raymond Workman, Victorian won the race by a nose over runner-up Toro. Nassak, the betting favorite from the powerful Rancocas Stable finished a distant 11th. The fifth-place finisher, Sun Beau, went on to a brilliant racing career and was voted U.S. Champion Older Horse in three straight years culminating with his 1996 induction into the U.S. National Museum of Racing and Hall of Fame.

No Triple Crown attempt
The owners of the Preakness winner chose not to send the colt to Louisville, Kentucky to compete in the May 19th Kentucky Derby. The Daily Racing Form reported that Victorian's owner made a statement by telephone saying the colt had gone through a very tough Preakness and did not do well after the race. Plans called for transporting Victorian to Belmont Park where he would run in the Withers Stakes if his trainer thought the colt was healthy. Victorian won the Withers Stakes.

Record crowd
The Daily Racing Form reported there was a record crowd in attendance on Preakness day which included notables such as Belgium's Prince Ernest and Princess Marguerite de Ligne, Joseph P. Kennedy Sr., father of a future President of the United States, the British Ambassador Sir Esmé Howard, Bernard Baruch, George Saportas, and James Wood Colt, among others.

Maryland Governor Albert Ritchie presented the Woodlawn Vase to James G. Rowe Jr., the winning trainer who accepted it on behalf of the absent Harry Payne Whitney.

Death of scheduled Preakness rider
Twenty-five-year-old jockey Ovila Bourassa was scheduled to ride Solace in the 1928 Preakness. The colt, who would finish third, was owned by the Seagram Stables for whom jockey Bourassa had ridden Sir Harry to a second-place finish in the 1927 Preakness Stakes. Three weeks prior to the running of the 1928 Preakness, the young jockey died from a fractured skull after the saddle girth slipped on a horse he was breezing in the early morning hours at Havre de Grace Racetrack in Havre de Grace, Maryland.

A champion Canadian jockey, and very popular with his racing fraternity and race fans in the United States, Ovila Bourassa's death received wide coverage in newspapers in both countries. The New York Times wrote that Bourassa "rode winners of many classics" and was "one of the best-known riders in the country". The New York Daily News called him a "rider of great promise" and someone who was "in the first rank of riders." In his native Canada, the Calgary Daily Herald said Ovila Bourassa was "one of the outstanding figures in Canadian racing."

Payout
The 51st Preakness Stakes Payout Schedule

The full chart
Daily Racing Form Charts

 Ŧ coupled  and † coupled
 Winning Breeder: Harry Payne Whitney; (KY)
 Times: 1/4 mile – 23 2/5; 1/2 mile – 47 2/5; 3/4 mile – 1:13 0/0; mile – 1:38 4/5; 1 3/16 (final) – 2:00 1/5
 Track condition: fast

References

External links
 
 Montreal La Presse newspaper photo of Ovila Bourassa. 

1928
Pimlico Race Course
1928 in horse racing
1928 in American sports
1928 in sports in Maryland
Horse races in Maryland